The 1995–96 Slovak Extraliga season was the third season of the Slovak Extraliga, the top level of ice hockey in Slovakia. 10 teams participated in the league, and HC Kosice won the championship.

Standings

Playoffs

Quarterfinals 
 HC Košice - HK 32 Liptovský Mikuláš 3:1 (5:2,5:1,2:4,5:1)
 Dukla Trenčín - Spartak Dubnica nad Váhom 3:0 (2:1,8:1,5:4)
 Martimex ZŤS Martin - HC Nitra 3:1 (4:1,3:0,1:3,4:1)
 ŠKP PS Poprad - Slovan Bratislava 1:3 (3:4 OT,3:4,6:5 OT,1:5)

Semifinals 
 HC Košice - Slovan Bratislava 4:1 (3:0,3:2 OT,4:6,8:2,5:4)
 Dukla Trenčín - Martimex ZŤS Martin 4:1 (2:1 OT,3:2,2:0,3:4 OT,5:3)

Classification 
 ŠKP PS Poprad - HK 32 Liptovský Mikuláš 2:0 (7:3,7:4)
 HC Nitra - Spartak Dubnica nad Váhom 2:0 (3:2 OT.,6:2)

7th place 
 Spartak Dubnica nad Váhom - HK 32 Liptovský Mikuláš 0:2 (2:4,5:8)

5th place 
 ŠKP PS Poprad - HC Nitra 2:0 (8:5,4:2)

3rd place 
 Martimex ZŤS Martin - Slovan Bratislava 1:3 (5:6 OT,5:3,2:5,0:2)

Final
 HC Košice - Dukla Trenčín 4:1 (3:2 OT,4:1,5:4 OT,3:6,7:1)

Relegation

External links
 Slovak Ice Hockey Federation

Slovak Extraliga seasons
1995–96 in European ice hockey leagues
Slovak